The sixth season of Will & Grace premiered on September 25, 2003 and concluded on April 29, 2004. It consisted of 24 episodes.

Cast and characters
Due to Debra Messing's pregnancy - which is visible in multiple episodes late in the season - Grace did not appear in five episodes; "Heart Like a Wheelchair" (episode 6), "I Never Cheered for My Father" (episode 21), "Speechless" (episode 22) and "I Do. Oh, No, You Didn't" (episode 23/24).

Main cast 
 Eric McCormack as Will Truman
 Debra Messing as Grace Adler
 Megan Mullally as Karen Walker
 Sean Hayes as Jack McFarland
 Shelley Morrison as Rosario Salazar

Recurring cast 
 Harry Connick Jr. as Dr. Marvin "Leo" Markus
 Leslie Jordan as Beverley Leslie
 John Cleese as Lyle Finster
 Minnie Driver as Lorraine Finster
 Dave Foley as Stuart Lamarack
 Tim Bagley as Larry
 Jerry Levine as Joe
 Bobby Cannavale as Vince D'Angelo
 Michael Angarano as Elliott

Guest stars 
 Emily Rutherfurd as Joanne
 Stephanie Faracy as Eva
 Laura Kightlinger as Nurse Sheila
 Lea DeLaria as Nurse Carver
 Kali Rocha as Stephanie
 Chris Penn as Rudy
 Keone Young as Owner
 Brandon Routh as Sebastian
 Kathryn Joosten as Felicia
 Kenneth Tigar as John
 Amy Farrington as Phyllis
 Sara Paxton as Melanie

Special guest stars 
 Blythe Danner as Marilyn Truman
 Mira Sorvino as Diane
 James Earl Jones as himself
 Gordon Davidson as himself
 Jack Black as Dr. Isaac Hershberg
 Dylan McDermott as Tom
 Candice Bergen as herself
 Tom Everett Scott as Alex
 Debbie Reynolds as Bobbi Adler
 Barry Manilow as himself
 Sara Gilbert as Cheryl
 Geena Davis as Janet Adler
 Hal Linden as Alan
 Tracey Ullman as Ann
 Suzanne Pleshette as Lois Whitley
 Eileen Brennan as Zandra
 Edie Falco as Deirdre
 Chloë Sevigny as Monet
 John Edward as himself
 Bebe Neuwirth as herself
 Sharon Osbourne as Nonny
 Lesley Ann Warren as Tina
 Jennifer Lopez as herself
 Tim Curry as Marion Finster

Episodes

References

6
2003 American television seasons
2004 American television seasons
Television episodes directed by James Burrows